Brand New was an American rock band from Long Island, New York. Formed in 2000, the band consisted of Jesse Lacey (vocals, guitar), Vincent Accardi (guitar, vocals), Garrett Tierney (bass guitar, vocals) and Brian Lane (drums, percussion); they were joined by Benjamin Homola (percussion) for their live performances. From 2005 to 2013, the band also included Derrick Sherman (guitar, backing vocals, keyboards). The band is recognized as one of the most influential within the 2000s emo scene, celebrated for making artistic statements with their music.

Lacey, Tierney and Lane all played in the band the Rookie Lot, from Levittown, New York. Lacey was also the founding bassist for Taking Back Sunday before leaving. With Accardi in 2000, they formed Brand New in Merrick, New York. The band signed to Triple Crown Records and in 2001 released their debut album Your Favorite Weapon. Their second album, Deja Entendu, was released in 2003 and marked a stylistic change for the band, one that garnered an extremely positive critical reception. The album's first two singles, "The Quiet Things That No One Ever Knows" and "Sic Transit Gloria... Glory Fades", both received airplay on MTV2 and Fuse TV, entering the top 40 on the United Kingdom Singles Chart. Deja Entendu was eventually certified gold in the United States.

Brand New moved to Interscope Records and released the critically acclaimed The Devil and God Are Raging Inside Me in 2006. "Jesus Christ" became their highest charting single in the US, peaking at number 30 on the Alternative Songs chart. In March 2008, the band started their own record label, Procrastinate! Music Traitors. Their fourth album, Daisy, which saw Accardi become a significant lyricist for the band, was released in 2009 and reached number six on the Billboard 200. 

The band released two non-album singles following Daisy: "Mene" in April 2015 and "I Am a Nightmare" in May 2016, also formally releasing the original demos for their third album which had been leaked on the internet a decade earlier. Brand New surprise-released their fifth and final album Science Fiction on August 17, 2017, two days after announcing its release on vinyl. Receiving both critical acclaim and commercial success, it became Brand New's first number-one album on the Billboard 200.

Though Lacey had stated that the band would disband in 2018, the band has been publicly inactive since late 2017, when he was accused of sexual misconduct occurring during the band's early days.

History

Formation and Your Favorite Weapon (2000–2002)
Prior to Brand New's official formation, in the late 1990s, Jesse Lacey, Garrett Tierney and Brian Lane were all members of the post-hardcore band the Rookie Lot, along with Brandon Reilly and Alex Dunne of Crime in Stereo. The Rookie Lot split and did not play for a while until Lacey, Lane and Tierney started to rehearse again. After Reilly joined the Movielife, they then recruited guitarist Vincent Accardi, who had been playing in a band called One Last Goodbye.

All four members had backgrounds linking into their local Long Island independent and hardcore music scenes, but with influences from an array of artists ranging from Buddy Rich to the Archers of Loaf. They eventually formed Brand New in 2000, in a basement in Merrick, New York. Their initial intention was always to "move outside of whatever notions they felt inclined to when they were making music as younger people." The band gained exposure in the local scene through playing shows with alternative rock contemporaries Midtown and post-hardcore bands like Glassjaw, while also self-releasing a four-song demo. They signed to Triple Crown Records just after their second-ever show.

Lane and Reilly came up with the band name Brand New, which Lacey said was "somewhat in jest because nothing about the band is really that new... we weren't trying to break ground with a new kind of sound or anything." Later, Lacey said that interpretation was not his original intention, claiming that "a friend of ours said he would call his band Brand New but he never got a new band so we took it. I wish it were something as clever as a sarcastic take on the state of music."

Brand New's debut studio album Your Favorite Weapon was produced by friend of the band Mike Sapone. The album has been described as being "bitter about ex-girlfriends", with an excessive concentration on "post-breakup angst". It received relatively positive reviews, with Allmusic awarding it three out of five and Popmatters also being favorable. It became a moderate success, selling over 50,000 copies. The record deal gave Brand New the opportunity to tour, playing alongside the likes of Taking Back Sunday and touring the UK in support of Finch, to a "great response" from the crowds.

The only single released from Your Favorite Weapon was "Jude Law and a Semester Abroad". The song has been described by Allmusic as a "semi-hit" after it received airplay on both MTV2 and Fuse.

Deja Entendu and acclaim (2003–2004)

Brand New's second studio album was written in the "year and-a-half or two years" that they were touring the material off of Your Favorite Weapon. According to drummer Brian Lane, "Jesse [Lacey] wrote a lot of the lyrics about different things than 'I just broke up with my girlfriend' for the new record," as Lacey had written the songs on an acoustic guitar in his bedroom. Lane also explained that the band was now influenced by a range of different artists: "All of us got exposed to a lot of different music that all of us were listening to. For the first [album] we weren't in such close quarters for 24 hours a day. I think that has a lot to do with it." Unlike their first album, it was said that a lot of time and concentration went into making the album.

The band released Deja Entendu through Razor & Tie/Triple Crown Records in June 2003, being issued in Europe and Australia in October 2003. The album's title, Deja Entendu, is French for "feels like I heard this before." It was explained as "very tongue-in-cheek" by vocalist Jesse Lacey. Elaborating on the title's meaning, he told MTV, "No matter who you are or what your band is about, you can't put a record out without people saying it's derivative of something else. So by saying the record's already been heard, it's kind of like saying, 'Yeah, you're right. We're doing something that's already been done before.'" He reinforced, "We're not trying to break new ground in music. We're just trying to make good music." The album was described as a "stylistic leap" from Your Favorite Weapon, with a "decidedly matured" sound. In an interview with Billboard, Lacey said that although Deja Entendu does offer a different sound, the album "doesn't seem like we're departing from anything, really. I think we always knew that we had a lot of potential and there's a lot of different stuff we were able to do, and a lot of different sounds we wanted to make. Not too long after we recorded the first record, we were already wondering where we were going to go from there."

Deja Entendu debuted at number 63 on the Billboard 200. After just seven weeks, the album's sales were at more than 51,000 copies, already closing in on the total figure of its predecessor, Your Favorite Weapon. In May 2007, four years after its release, it was certified gold for surpassing 500,000 sales in the United States by the Recording Industry Association of America.

Deja Entendus first single, "The Quiet Things That No One Ever Knows", impacted radio airplay in July 2003, a month after the album's release. The song was said to be about regret, or, as Lacey stated, "how there can be problems in a relationship and they get ignored. And how that often ends up as a broken home or some kind of bad situation down the road. It's kind of something that if it wasn't overlooked in the first place, you can kind of get through it." The song's music video chronicles the moments after a severe car accident, where a mortally wounded Lacey cannot depart for the next world until he knows that his girlfriend, also injured in the crash, is safe in this one. He says it "is about death or losing someone and it's those moments that you kind of look back on your life and realize all the regrets that you had, and all the things you wish you could change". They also made a music video for the second single, "Sic Transit Gloria... Glory Fades," where Lacey acts like a human voodoo doll, discovering that when he moves a particular body part, it is mimicked by the target of his action. "Since the song is about taking advantage of someone else," he said, "there's a pretty strong correlation between the video and the song." Both music videos gave the band exposure in the mainstream where Your Favorite Weapon went "virtually unnoticed", with the videos finding "constant" airplay on MTV and the band making its live television debut on Jimmy Kimmel Live!. Furthermore, both singles entered the top 40 on the UK Singles Chart, whilst "The Quiet Things That No One Ever Knows" peaked at number 37 on Billboard's Alternative Songs chart.

Three shows of the band's 24-date headlining US tour with Moneen, Senses Fail, and the Beautiful Mistake had sold out prior to even having released a single, with much of the buzz surrounding the band being produced by just word-of-mouth, touring and Internet message boards. Deja Entendu'''s success also earned them tours alongside New Found Glory, Good Charlotte, Dashboard Confessional, and Blink-182. The band went on to headline The Bamboozle festival with My Chemical Romance, Alkaline Trio, Thrice, the Starting Line, Fall Out Boy, the Bouncing Souls, Straylight Run and Flogging Molly. They also made their second trip to the UK in 2004, their first as the headline act, and the tour completely sold out.

In the wake of Deja Entendu, Brand New was pegged as an act to watch in Rolling Stones annual "Hot Issue." The band topped punk critics' year-end lists with the "genre-defying" Deja Entendu, and the album was described as a "landmark album of so-called 'emo-punk'." As a result of both the album's success and the band's notable underground following, Brand New found itself in the middle of a bidding war from record labels. At the time, Lane disagreed with the usage of the phrase "bidding war", but conceded, "There's a few labels that are definitely interested. We've been talking to a lot of people for a while and we're narrowing it down." The band eventually signed with DreamWorks Records, which was then taken over by Interscope Records.

The Devil and God Are Raging Inside Me and continued acclaim (2005–2007)

Following their signing to Interscope, Brand New stopped touring to work on their third album and major label debut. In this time, little to no interviews or updates came from the band. In 2004, Jesse Lacey told Chart magazine that he had written a "few songs" for the next album, commenting that "the other guys love it already". He made mention of the pressure he felt with the "loads of anticipation building up on my shoulders," saying that he suffered from depression because of this; "I'm getting depressed with all of the anxiety about the album and they say I write my best stuff when I'm in that state. Great, I'll spend the next six months all depressed and the rest of band will be excited, so that some good [material] might come out. And then I have to contend with how it's received." Lacey also said that the album would "move into new territory for Brand New".

In late 2005, Brand New started recording their highly anticipated third album in Oxford, Mississippi with producer Dennis Herring, but later dropped him in favor of Mike Sapone with whom they had worked on their first album.

In January 2006, nine tracks recorded for the album were leaked to the Internet. In response to the leak, Garrett Tierney stated "I would say it did it in a good way 'cause so many people were curious to hear what we have been doing—and for the most part, the record tracks don't sound anything like the leaked demos." However, Lacey was not so upbeat when asked, saying, "For me it was different. It had me pretty down for a while. No one likes to show their creation in mid-process, and those songs weren't done. They were like blueprints. Just the plan, right? It put me in a state where I was under the impression that those songs had been wasted or something—that we had to go and write new things because those had been heard. Now, in retrospect, I want those songs to be on the album and many of them aren't, and I'm probably more to blame for that than anyone. This record already feels incomplete to me without those tracks and probably will forever."

In the following months, with Brand New doing their first tour dates in over 18 months, a few songs from the demos were performed with a full band, some were fleshed out and had new lyrics. New songs had their debut as well during the summer tour dates. Brand New began their first tour in years on June 20, 2006, where Lacey stated that the album had been completed the previous day.Alternative Press published a preliminary date of October 10, 2006, as the album's release date; this was later corrected on the band's official website, when it was announced that the new album would be released on November 21, 2006 in North America, and the day before in Europe. Soon after, a track listing and cover art were revealed, as well as new information regarding the release of the first single – "Sowing Season". Having previously been leaked as a demo, the completed song began airing on radio on October 19, 2006, and appeared on their MySpace page a day later. According to Lacey in a radio interview from the UK (BBC Radio 1 with Zane Lowe), the title The Devil and God Are Raging Inside Me is taken from a conversation he had with his friend about the musician Daniel Johnston, who has bipolar disorder. The Devil and God Are Raging Inside Me has since become Brand New's most critically acclaimed album and is considered one of the best albums of the 2000s.

In late December 2006, an unusual video was released for the instrumental track "Untitled", also known as "-", which consists of a man spray painting a wall with "evil and good are raging inside me" and correcting it to give the album title. On January 16, 2007, "Jesus Christ" was announced as the next official single from the album. It peaked at number 30 on Billboard's Alternative Songs chart, becoming Brand New's biggest hit. On January 19, the band performed the song on Late Night with Conan O'Brien. They performed it again on February 26 on the Late Show with David Letterman.

From January to June 2007, the band toured the United States, Europe, Canada, and Australia, including a headline slot on the UK's Give It A Name festival and playing the main stage at The Bamboozle festival. Despite the band's reluctance towards the press around the time of the release of the album, they were featured in Alternative Press, a cover story for Rock Sound, Kerrang!, and NME. The band went on tour for the fall of 2007, with openers Thrice and MewithoutYou. In early 2008, Brand New toured Australia and New Zealand on the Big Day Out festival.

In October 2007, the band announced via their official website that a new song, entitled "(Fork and Knife)", would be released online on October 23, 2007. "(Fork and Knife)", a rerecorded version of the track formerly known as "Untitled 7" from the leaked demos, was released as a non-album digital download.

Daisy (2008–2009)
In March 2008, Brand New started their own record label, Procrastinate! Music Traitors. The first act signed to the new label was longtime friend Kevin Devine. The first release from the label was a reissue of the 2006 Kevin Devine album, Put Your Ghost to Rest, in April 2008.

In October 2008, it was stated that Brand New was in the studio winding down their new record and were currently recording vocals. Then in December, an update on Brand New's website announced that they had been in and out of the studio since about March, with roughly 15 tracks to choose from. The album was recorded over a 12-month period from March 2008, with the band announcing in April 2009 that they had commenced mixing with Dave Sardy and that they hoped to release their fourth studio album in the summer of 2009, with potentially, a summer tour to follow. The release date was then delayed to October 2009, which was announced during a live performance at the 2009 Glastonbury Festival, where Brand New played two new songs, tentatively titled "Bride" and "Gasoline". The band played on the main stage at Reading and Leeds Festivals in August 2009; both performances at Reading Festival and Glastonbury Festival were filmed by the BBC however Brand New declined the BBC rights to broadcast either performance on television or on the BBC website.

In June 2009, UK music magazine Rock Sound, claimed on their website that they had received a copy of the upcoming album, though it was, according to an image later posted by the editor, "incomplete." The site published a "tentative" track listing and reported the incomplete version that they had received to be roughly 30 minutes long.

In an interview with Kerrang!, Jesse Lacey commented on the upcoming album's content, "It's a pretty exhausting record. It's quite dense and I think some of the decisions we made don't always go in the most obvious direction. We were thinking a lot more about what we'd want to play when we were up onstage rather than actually what you'd want to hear on a record." He then questioned the future of the band, saying, "I think a lot of the record is about us trying to make decisions about how long the band should go on. When I listened back to it, I realized how many songs are about something coming to a close, or knowing when it's time to put something away and move on."

On July 7, it was announced that the album would be titled And One Head Can Never Die (stylized and one head can never die) and would be released through Interscope Records on September 22, 2009. However, on July 9, it was announced on the band's website that the album title had been changed to Daisy, with the release date remaining unchanged. The album's first single, "At the Bottom", was released through digital outlets on August 11, 2009. Daisy saw vocalist Jesse Lacey step back from songwriting and giving the role to guitarist Vincent Accardi along with the other members of the band.Daisy debuted at number six on the Billboard 200 in the US, selling 46,000 records in what was their first top 20 entrance on the chart after The Devil and God Are Raging Inside Me had reached number 31.

Brand New announced a North American tour to promote Daisy, with opening acts including Coheed and Cambria, Manchester Orchestra, Thrice and Glassjaw. A concert at their hometown Nassau Coliseum sold over 6,000 tickets in the first day. The band played its largest UK concert yet on January 23, 2010, headling London's Wembley Arena in front of 12,500 people supported by Glassjaw and Thrice.

Gap between albums (2009–2017)
When asked if rumors were true that Daisy would be the band's final release, Lacey replied "I don't think that will be true. It might be our last full-length record for a little while, but we've got a lot of things lined up that we want to record, so I think that will happen pretty soon."

Writing sessions for the band's fifth studio album first began in 2009, shortly after the band released Daisy. Lacey stated that the band had new material that they were looking to record, dismissing rumors that Daisy would be their last full-length album. Discussing the musical direction of the fifth album, Lacey stated that he believed Daisy "was like the end of a road" and that they would likely backtrack and explore an alternative direction to take their new music. 

In early 2010, drummer Brian Lane stated that Brand New were unsure about how they plan to release music in the future with technology being a factor; "I don’t know if there’s a point to releasing records if they’re not physical releases, if we're going to release a lot of things digitally then I don’t see why we couldn’t release a song a week or a song a month or just put out what we like from whenever we record." Lane also discussed the way the band may release their records in the future, "We’re talking about recording another album but we don’t know whether it’s going to come out on a label or whether we just release songs in batches."

On April 28, 2010, at their show in Clifton Park, New York, it was announced that the band fulfilled their contract with Interscope Records and were now unsigned. On November 21, 2011, the band reissued their debut album Your Favorite Weapon with new artwork and bonus tracks. The band was booked to enter a recording studio in April 2012, however, the members ultimately used this time for personal musical projects as opposed to recording Brand New. It was officially announced through the band's website on June 19, 2014 that the band had been writing and recording new material, as well as building their own studio.

Brand New played a co-headlining show with Modest Mouse at Forest Hills Stadium on August 9, 2014, only the third show at the venue in the last 15 years.

In April 2015, it was reported that the band had sent out lyric booklets for their album The Devil and God are Raging Inside Me as part of an unfulfilled offer made nine years previously, whereby if fans sent $1 they would receive the lyrics. The booklet, titled Pogolith 000, was first teased in late 2014 on the band's website by The Up Studio. The booklet also contained a poster alluding to the release of the band's previously unreleased 2005 Fight Off Your Demons demos on cassette tape, as well as a postcard with the words "rip 2018", sparking rumors of a possible breakup of the band. As part of Record Store Day 2015, the band rereleased their second album Deja Entendu as a limited vinyl, accompanied by Pogolith 00, a booklet containing the lyrics to the album. A standard edition, non-limited vinyl was made available on May 5, 2015. Both Pogolith 000 and Pogolith 00 were later made available at shows and through the band's online store.

At their April 8, 2015 show in Denver, Colorado, the band performed a new song listed on the band's setlist as "Don't Feel Anything", which was later titled "Mene". On April 13, the track was made available as a free download through the band's website. A second new song, "Sealed to Me", was premiered in Los Angeles, California on April 15. The band allowed their performances at Lollapalooza in Berlin on September 13, 2015 and Austin City Limits in Austin, Texas on October 3, 2015 to be broadcast. This marked the first time the band allowed their performance to be broadcast, with Lacey previously stating that the band were not comfortable recording their live sets. On October 11, 2015 while playing their last show of the 2015 tour at the Ryman Auditorium, Lacey told the audience that "this isn't going to last much longer". He spoke about his friendships with the band, the possibility of a new album, and how he would soon be a father.

When an image of controversial medicine price-gouger Martin Shkreli wearing a Brand New shirt circulated on the internet in September 2015, the band responded by putting the shirt on sale and donating all of its proceeds to the Whitman-Walker Health AIDS charity.

On December 2, 2015, the band made their Leaked Demos 2006 available for the first time, releasing it on a limited edition red cassette tape with a digital download card included. The cassette was later released in black. On May 17, 2016, the band released a new single entitled "I Am a Nightmare" with a new album scheduled for release in 2016. Brand New announced another co-headling tour with Modest Mouse in 2016, making a stop at New York City's iconic Madison Square Garden.

On July 13, 2016, the band released an EP called 3 Demos, Reworked. The EP contains re-recorded versions of 3 songs that appear on Leaked Demos 2006. On July 22, 2016, the band released a physical 7" single of Mene with the b-side "Out of Range," a previously unreleased song that had been leaked in 2010.

During the same summer, new shirt designs were revealed by the band through social media, two of which state "2000-2018". One of the designs was also projected onto the stage after the band's show on the same day at the Vogue Theatre in Vancouver, increasing the amount of speculation regarding that the band may be implying a planned breakup in the year 2018. Lacey confirmed the speculation in between songs during a set in Salt Lake City, Utah in June. He stated, "We’re done. Oh yeah, we’re done, and it makes nights like this all the more special so thanks for being here."

On September 26, 2016, the band revealed that the latest album that had previously been promised to fans would not be released in 2016. The band felt that the songs on the album were incomplete and needed more time to be deemed finalized. The band also announced that it would be celebrating the 10-year anniversary of The Devil and God are Raging Inside Me by playing it in its entirety the remainder of the tour. There also were more statements alluding to the band's end: "What’s left should be a strange demise, but hopefully one as loud and as fun as the rest of our time together has been. All are invited. Please send flowers."

 Science Fiction and disbandment (2017–2018) 
On August 15, 2017, the band announced on Instagram that their fifth LP would be released on vinyl in October 2017. Two days later on August 17, many people who had pre-ordered the vinyl edition of the album received a CD (limited to 500) in the post that contained an album in its entirety, named Science Fiction, compressed into one 61-minute long track. The album was later put up for sale on their website confirming it as their fifth LP. Science Fiction was met with widespread critical acclaim and commercial success, as it became Brand New's first album to debut at number one on the Billboard 200.

On September 13, 2017,  Kevin Devine announced via Facebook that he would be taking time off of his own project, Kevin Devine and the Goddamn Band, to join Brand New on their Science Fiction tour as an additional guitarist and vocalist. Nada Surf, a band Lacey has professed himself a fan of, served as the opening act for the tour. During a performance in October 2017, Lacey further confirmed the band's end, stating "We’re gonna be a band for about 14 more months, so thank you so much for being here tonight."

In late 2017, Lacey was accused of sexual misconduct occurring during the early and mid-2000s. He issued a public apology on Brand New's Facebook page, prompting touring guitarist Kevin Devine and supporting act Martha to pull out of the upcoming European tour dates. The band later announced the postponement of all of their upcoming tour dates, which were not rescheduled. Aside from a few meetings at guitarist Accardi's Joshua Tree home and at a Texas studio, they have remained publicly inactive since November 2017, neither confirming nor denying the break-up of the band.

On December 31, 2018, a track rumored to be titled "Simple Man" was leaked onto the internet.

On October 25, 2021, John D'Esposito, the founder of The Bamboozle musical festival, revealed that he had attempted to convince Brand New to reform and play the 2023 edition of the festival, but the band declined his request.

Musical style and influences
Brand New is most often described as emo, indie rock, and alternative rock,
with their debut album Your Favorite Weapon described as pop punk.

The band has had a mixed relationship with the emo label. "I think emo started on this single-faceted idea of, 'I was hurt by someone else' ... but it's only a small part of the entire spectrum of emotion that people go through. Unfortunately, the struggle against this trend of music we were grouped in with has become a large part of our band," Lacey said in 2004. Long Island concert promoter Christian McKnight said that "they never really had the scene association like Taking Back Sunday, and I think a lot of that was by choice. They became more brooding and isolated, and they weren’t part of the bigger scene at large." Pitchfork wrote that "The Devil and God Are Raging Inside Me is not an emo record. It might actually be post-emo."

The band has rejected the pop punk label outside of Your Favorite Weapon, an album which the band is "somewhat ashamed of". Drummer Brian Lane said, "We're not a pop punk band. The first record I can easily see it. The second record, there's nothing on it that says pop punk whatsoever... I don't hear any influences of NOFX or anything like that." Many reviews of Deja Entendu compared Brand New to Bright Eyes, which Lane said was "better than being compared to New Found Glory... that group of bands is getting old very quick and played out." Lacey criticized mainstream pop punk in a 2003 Rolling Stone interview, referring to it as music "about how we've been wronged and got our hearts broken and nobody understands," and said that Brand New would be following in Radiohead's footsteps rather than Good Charlotte's.

 Influences 
Brand New has listed a wide variety of bands as influences from genres ranging from shoegaze to noise rock. The band has listed The Smiths and their frontman Morrissey as favorites, including a reference to them on "Mix Tape". Lacey has also cited English rock bands such as Ride, The Stone Roses and The Beatles as major influences. Brand New's noisier elements were influenced by adolescent favorites Sonic Youth and My Bloody Valentine.

During the Daisy era, Lacey was influenced by Polvo, Archers of Loaf, Fugazi and Modest Mouse, Accardi cited Pearl Jam, Alice in Chains and Stone Temple Pilots while Tierney's bass playing emulated Hüsker Dü and The Jesus Lizard. Brand New also paid homage to The Jesus Lizard's album Goat with the single artwork for "Jesus Christ".

Brand New have toured with a number of their influences. Built to Spill opened for them in 2015, and the band embarked on a co-headlining tour with Modest Mouse in 2016.

Lacey has publicly expressed his fandom for bands that did not directly influence Brand New's sound, such as Radiohead, Bloc Party, Sigur Rós, and Explosions in the Sky.

Legacy and influence
Brand New has been recognized as one of the most beloved and important bands of the emo genre. Their enduring following, described as "cult-like", is notable in that their fanbase and legacy have continuously remained strong throughout their entire career whereas other bands from the 2000s emo scene have faded into obscurity. They have been widely praised by critics for creating artistic statements with their music instead of aiming for mainstream success like many of their contemporaries did. Ian Cohen of Pitchfork remarked, "popular guitar music in 2017 has been undeniably shaped by Brand New, a band who has served not just as damaged role models but as a formative musical influence." Writing for The Outline, Zoe Camp stated that "they were increasingly sincere and self-aware in a genre where emotional histrionics were the default setting. Music like this made them, and Lacey, seem definitively different than Fall Out Boy’s Pete Wentz, Taking Back Sunday’s Adam Lazzara, or virtually any other sad white guy who once covered Alternative Press." Spin declared that "Brand New didn’t just became a band, they became a lifeline and sanctuary for thousands upon thousands of messed-up kids." Ryan Bassil of Noisey declared Brand New "to be crowned the best band of a generation." Music writers have credited the eight-year gap between 2009's Daisy and 2017's Science Fiction as essential for the growth of Brand New's legacy in the music world.

Brand New's influence on the new wave of downbeat hip hop has also been noted, with Lindsay Zoladz of The Ringer stating "your future favorite rapper might be listening to Brand New right now." Lil Peep sampled Brand New's "The No Seatbelt Song" on his track "Crybaby".

Artists influenced by Brand New include Manchester Orchestra, mewithoutYou, Cymbals Eat Guitars, Citizen, Oso Oso, Amy Shark, Sorority Noise, Moose Blood and The Xcerts. Pop singer Halsey has referred to their third album in particular as a major influence and Lacey as "largely responsible for why I write with such detail."

Foxing lead singer Conor Murphy pointed to a motivational speech that Lacey gave the band before their first show opening for Brand New as a pivotal moment in the band's development. Cymbals Eat Guitars singer Joe D’Agostino said that opening for Brand New exposed the band to a wider audience that would not have discovered them had it not been for the tour. Thrice's 2015 reunion came about after band members witnessed an inspiring Brand New concert and conversed with the band about touring again.

Band members
Final line-up
 Vincent Accardi – lead guitar, vocals (2000–2018)
 Jesse Lacey – lead vocals, rhythm guitar (2000–2018)
 Brian Lane – drums, percussion (2000–2018)
 Garrett Tierney – bass guitar, backing vocals (2000–2018)

Former members
 Derrick Sherman – keyboards, guitars, backing vocals (2005–2013)

Discography

Studio albums
 Your Favorite Weapon (2001)
 Deja Entendu (2003)
 The Devil and God Are Raging Inside Me (2006)
 Daisy (2009)
 Science Fiction'' (2017)

References

External links

 Official website

 
2000 establishments in New York (state)
Alternative rock groups from New York (state)
American emo musical groups
Indie rock musical groups from New York (state)
Interscope Records artists
Musical groups established in 2000
Musical groups from Long Island
Musical quartets
Pop punk groups from New York (state)
Razor & Tie artists
Triple Crown Records artists